Syntomodrillia tantula is an extinct species of sea snail, a marine gastropod mollusk in the family Drilliidae.

The secondary junior homonym Syntomodrillia tantula Bartsch, P., 1934 is considered by Fallon a synonym of Syntomodrillia portoricana Fallon, P.J., 2016

Description

Distribution
This extinct species was found in Mississippi, USA

References

 Conrad, Timothy Abbot. Observations on the Eocene Formation, and Descriptions of One Hundred and Five New Fossils of that Period, from the Vicinity of Vicksburg, Mississippi: With an Appendix. 1848.

External links
 Smith, E.A. (1888) Diagnoses of new species of Pleurotomidae in the British Museum. Annals and Magazine of Natural History, series 6, 2, 300–317
 Fallon P.J. (2016). Taxonomic review of tropical western Atlantic shallow water Drilliidae (Mollusca: Gastropoda: Conoidea) including descriptions of 100 new species. Zootaxa. 4090(1): 1–363

tantula